Al Hussain Saleh (Arabic: الحسين صالح) (born 25 June 1991) is an Emirati footballer who plays as a winger and left back.

External links

References

Emirati footballers
1991 births
Living people
Ras Al Khaimah Club players
Emirates Club players
Al-Nasr SC (Dubai) players
Al Wahda FC players
Hatta Club players
Place of birth missing (living people)
UAE First Division League players
UAE Pro League players
Association football midfielders
Association football defenders